George Hodgson Townsend (June 4, 1867 in Hartsdale, New York – March 15, 1930 in New Haven, Connecticut), nicknamed "Sleepy", was an American baseball player who played catcher in the Major Leagues from 1887 to 1891. He played for the Philadelphia Athletics and Baltimore Orioles.

References

1867 births
1930 deaths
Major League Baseball catchers
Philadelphia Athletics (AA) players
Baltimore Orioles (AA) players
19th-century baseball players
NYU Violets baseball players
Reading (minor league baseball) players
Baltimore Orioles (Atlantic Association) players
Binghamton Bingos players
Rochester Flour Cities players
Baseball players from New York (state)
People from Hartsdale, New York